This is a list of notable painters from, or associated with, Latvia.

A
Ādams Alksnis (1864–1897)
Arturs Akopjans (born 1969)

B
Auseklis Baušķenieks (1910–2007)
Biruta Baumane (1922–2017) 
Johann Heinrich Baumann (1753–1832)
Aleksandra Belcova (1892–1981)
Boriss Berziņš (1930–2002)

C
Vija Celmins (born 1939)

D
Jonas Damelis (1780–1840)
Lilija Dinere (born 1955)
Aleksandr Drevin (1889–1938)

G
Jazeps Grosvalds (1891–1920)
Hugo Kārlis Grotuss (1884–1951)

H
Kārlis Hūns (1831–1877)

K
Ingrīda Kadaka (born 1967)
Jānis Kalmīte (1907–1996)
Jēkabs Kazaks (1895–1920)
Mārtiņš Krūmiņš (1900–1992)

L
André Lapine (1866–1952)
Jānis Liepiņš (1894–1964)

M
Arnolds Mazītis (1913–2002)
Leo Michelson (1887–1978)

P
Kārlis Padegs (1911–1940)
Tatyana Palchuk (born 1954) 
Lucia Peka (1912–1991)
Jāzeps Pīgoznis (1934–2014)
Miervaldis Polis (born 1948)
Līga Purmale (born 1948)
Vilhelms Purvītis (1872–1945)

R
Rudolf Ray Rapaport (1891–1984)
Mark Rothko (1903–1970)
Janis Rozentāls (1866–1916)
Francis Rudolph (1921–2005)

S
Anda Skadmane (born 1990)
Džemma Skulme (1925–2019)
Uga Skulme (1895–1963)
Maurice Sterne (1878–1957)

T
Jānis Tilbergs (1880–1972)

U
Konrāds Ubāns (1893–1981)
Teodors Ūders (1868–1915)

V
Edgars Vinters (1919–2014)

W
Zanis Waldheims (1909–1993)

Z
Ilgvars Zalans (born 1962)

See also
List of Latvian artists
 Culture of Latvia

Latvian painters
Painters